Children's Peace Literature Award is an Australian literary prize awarded every other year by the South Australian Psychologists for Peace, an interest group of the Australian Psychological Society.

The Children's Peace Literature Award was inaugurated in 1987, when Gillian Rubinstein won for her book Space Demons.

Award winners

References

External links 
 Official website

Australian literary awards
Awards established in 1987
Australian literature-related lists